Jaroszyński (feminine Jaroszyńska) is a Polish surname. Notable people with the surname include:

 Karol Jaroszyński (1878–1929), Polish entrepreneur
 Paweł Jaroszyński (born 1994), Polish footballer

Polish-language surnames